Burning Skies is an EP by English post-punk band Tones on Tail. It was released on 6 May 1983 on record label Situation Two.

Track listing

Critical reception 

Trouser Press commented that the EP "offers very little songwriting content, merely scanty ideas in service of largely pointless studio fiddling".

Personnel 
 Tones on Tail

 Daniel Ash – production
 Glenn Campling – production
 Kevin Haskins – production

 Technical

 Derek Tomkins – engineering

References

External links 

 

1983 EPs
Gothic rock EPs
Post-punk EPs
Situation Two EPs